Chelan County may refer to:

Places
Chelan County, Washington

Ships
USS Chelan County (LST-542), a United States Navy tank landing ship in commission as USS LST-542 from 1944 to 1955 and as USS Chelan County from 1955 to 1956